Ecsenius is a large genus of fish in the family Blenniidae. Several species, including Ecsenius midas, the Midas blenny, and Ecsenius bicolor, the bicolor blenny, are commonly sold at aquarium stores as pets.

Species
There are currently 53 recognized species in this genus:
 Ecsenius aequalis V. G. Springer, 1988 (Fourline blenny)
 Ecsenius alleni V. G. Springer, 1988
 Ecsenius aroni V. G. Springer, 1971 (Aron's blenny)
 Ecsenius australianus V. G. Springer, 1988 (Australian blenny)
 Ecsenius axelrodi V. G. Springer, 1988 (Axelrod's clown blenny)
 Ecsenius bandanus V. G. Springer, 1971 (Banda comb-tooth)
 Ecsenius bathi V. G. Springer, 1988 (Bath's comb-tooth)
 Ecsenius bicolor (F. Day, 1888) (Bicolor blenny)
 Ecsenius bimaculatus V. G. Springer, 1971
 Ecsenius caeruliventris V. G. Springer & G. R. Allen, 2004 (Bluebelly blenny)
 Ecsenius collettei V. G. Springer, 1972 (Collete's blenny)
 Ecsenius dentex V. G. Springer, 1988
 Ecsenius dilemma V. G. Springer, 1988
 Ecsenius fijiensis V. G. Springer, 1988
 Ecsenius fourmanoiri V. G. Springer, 1972
 Ecsenius frontalis (Valenciennes, 1836) (Smooth-fin blenny)
 Ecsenius gravieri (Pellegrin, 1906) (Red Sea mimic blenny)
 Ecsenius isos McKinney & V. G. Springer, 1976
 Ecsenius kurti V. G. Springer, 1988
 Ecsenius lineatus Klausewitz, 1962 (Linear blenny)
 Ecsenius lividanalis W. M. Chapman & L. P. Schultz, 1952 (Blue-head combtooth-blenny)
 Ecsenius lubbocki V. G. Springer, 1988 (Lubbock's combtooth-blenny)
 Ecsenius mandibularis McCulloch, 1923 (Queensland blenny)
 Ecsenius melarchus McKinney & V. G. Springer, 1976 (Yellow-eyed comb-tooth)
 Ecsenius midas Starck, 1969 (Persian blenny)
 Ecsenius minutus Klausewitz, 1963
 Ecsenius monoculus V. G. Springer, 1988
 Ecsenius nalolo J. L. B. Smith, 1959 (Nalolo)
 Ecsenius namiyei (D. S. Jordan & Evermann, 1902) (Black comb-tooth)
 Ecsenius niue V. G. Springer, 2002
 Ecsenius oculatus V. G. Springer, 1988
 Ecsenius oculus V. G. Springer, 1971 (Ocular blenny)
 Ecsenius ops V. G. Springer & G. R. Allen, 2001
 Ecsenius opsifrontalis W. M. Chapman & L. P. Schultz, 1952 (Comical blenny)
 Ecsenius pardus V. G. Springer, 1988
 Ecsenius paroculus V. G. Springer, 1988
 Ecsenius pictus McKinney & V. G. Springer, 1976 (White-lined comb-tooth)
 Ecsenius polystictus V. G. Springer & J. E. Randall, 1999
 Ecsenius portenoyi V. G. Springer, 1988
 Ecsenius prooculis W. M. Chapman & L. P. Schultz, 1952
 Ecsenius pulcher (J. A. Murray, 1887)
 Ecsenius randalli V. G. Springer, 1991
 Ecsenius schroederi McKinney & V. G. Springer, 1976
 Ecsenius sellifer V. G. Springer, 1988 (Saddle blenny)
 Ecsenius shirleyae V. G. Springer & G. R. Allen, 2004
 Ecsenius stictus V. G. Springer, 1988 (Great Barrier Reef blenny)
 Ecsenius stigmatura Fowler, 1952
 Ecsenius taeniatus V. G. Springer, 1988
 Ecsenius tessera V. G. Springer, 1988
 Ecsenius tigris V. G. Springer, 1988 (Tiger blenny)
 Ecsenius tricolor V. G. Springer & G. R. Allen, 2001
 Ecsenius trilineatus V. G. Springer, 1972 (Three-lined blenny)
 Ecsenius yaeyamaensis (Aoyagi, 1954) (Yaeyama blenny)

References 

 
Salarinae
Taxa named by Allan Riverstone McCulloch
Marine fish genera